Matthew Kelly (born 1950) is an English actor and television presenter.

Matthew Kelly or Matt Kelly may also refer to:

Real persons  

 Matthew Kelly (historian) (1814–1858), Irish Roman Catholic priest, academic and antiquary
 Matthew Kelly (footballer) (born 1971), former Australian rules footballer
 Matthew Kelly (speaker) (born 1973), Australian international speaker and business consultant
Matt Kelley (born 1978), Korean-American writer
 Matthew Kelly (cricketer) (born 1994), Australian cricketer
Matt Kelly (ice hockey), see 2007–08 Victoria Salmon Kings season
 Matthew Kelly (The Autumns), American vocalist and guitarist associated with the Autumns and the Sound of Animals Fighting
 Matthew Kelly (musician), American musician, singer, and songwriter for Kingfish and RatDog
Matt Kelly of Bully Records
Matt Kelly, drummer for Dropkick Murphys

Fictional characters 
Matt Kelly, character in Alaska Seas